Burma competed at the 1968 Summer Olympics in Mexico City, Mexico. They fielded four competitors, all men.

Athletics

Men
Track & road events

Boxing

Men

References
Official Olympic Reports
Part Three: Results

Nations at the 1968 Summer Olympics
1968
1968 in Burmese sport